Mihai Iacob (11 May 1933 – 5 July 2009) was a Romanian film director and screenwriter. He directed twelve films between 1955 and 1972. His 1961 film Thirst was entered into the 2nd Moscow International Film Festival.

Filmography
 Blanca (co-director Constantin Neagu, 1955)
 Dincolo de brazi (co-director Mircea Drăgan, 1957)
 Thirst (1960)
 Darclee (1961)
 Celebrul 702 (1962)
 Străinul (1964)
 Pe drumurile Thaliei (1964)
 Politețe (1966, documentary)
 De trei ori București (co-directors Ion Popescu-Gopo and Horea Popescu, 1967, anthology film)
  (dir. Wolfgang Liebeneiner, 1968, TV miniseries)
 Castelul condamnaților (1969)
 Pentru că se iubesc (1972)

References

External links

1933 births
2009 deaths
People from Orăștie
Romanian film directors
Romanian screenwriters
20th-century screenwriters